Lake Krasnoye (literally Red Lake, before 1948 Punnusjärvi) is a lake in Priozersky District of Leningrad Oblast, near Korobitsyno.

Geography
The lake is located in the central part of the Karelian Isthmus and belongs to the River Vuoksi drainage basin. It is a 6.9 km by 2.8 km lake and its area is about 9 km2.

See also
List of lakes of Russia

References

Karelian Isthmus
Krasnoye
LKrasnoye